Sadda Adda is a 2012 Indian comedy film directed by Muazzam Beg. The film was Muazzam Beg's directorial debut. Sadda Adda was produced by Rajeev Agarwal, Ramesh Agarwal and Tarun Agarwal, under the banner of Rajtaru Studios Limited.

Plot
The film depicts how six bachelors live together, despite their completely different backdrops and personalities like bihari Safal Yadav Manpaur (Madhubani). Their home, which they call "Sadda Adda", is an absolute mess of beer bottles, dirty clothes, and mattresses, yet together, they carry out the tasks of cooking, cleaning and paying the rent, while sharing laughter and tears, and always standing up for each other like a family. "Sadda Adda" starts as a midway room to assist them while they work towards their dreams, but turns out to become their true home. Movie starts from a morning scene where all friends starts their day with arguments, Movie goes on with the struggle they face individually and fight for their dreams. Safal kill himself after failing in PCS exams, however the lesson to learn for youguesers staying away from family and chasing their dreams is to keep fidhting. In the end Sameer becomes an executive in MNC while Irfan started own Architectural firm. It is indicated that Jogi continues his job and travels abroad, Rajat reunited with others coming back from USA with wife.

Cast
 Karanvir Sharma as Sameer Khanna
 Shaurya Chauhan as Shreya Gujral
 Bhaumik Sampat as Irfan Habib
 Kadambari Jethwani as Ridhima
 Rohin Robert as Rajat Hooda
 Rohit Arora as Jogi
 Kunal Panth as Kabir Asthana
 Parimal Alok as Safal Yadav

Production
The trailer was released with movie ‘Rockstar’ in theatres. The producers promoted the film with a rock concert at Bhavans College in Andheri, Mumbai. Big Digital division of Reliance Broadcasting Network Ltd has acquired the official music rights.

Soundtrack
Background  score by Vladimir Persan, Songs was composed by Shamir Tandon, A Band of Boys and Ramji Gulati, with lyrics by Prashant Pandey, Sandeep Nath, Ramji Gulati, Shamir Tandon and Karan Oberoi.

Track list

References

External links
 

2010s Hindi-language films
Indian comedy films
Films scored by Shamir Tandon
2012 comedy films
2012 films
Hindi-language comedy films